Stock mix is the combination of products a company sells or manufactures. The stock mix is determined by the demand for certain products and the profitability of those products.

Inventory